The Time Travelers is a film directed by Ib Melchior and starring Preston Foster, Philip Carey, Merry Anders, Steve Franken, and John Hoyt. (Delores Wells, Playboy'''s Miss June 1960, has a bit part, as does superfan Forrest J Ackerman.) The film inspired the 1966 TV series The Time Tunnel, as well as the 1967 remake Journey to the Center of Time. The plot involves a group of scientists who find that due to an electrical overload their time-viewing screen suddenly allows them to travel through time. American International Pictures released the film as a double feature with Atragon.

Plot
Scientists Dr. Erik von Steiner, Dr. Steve Connors, and Carol White are testing their time-viewing device, drawing enormous amounts of power. Danny McKee, a technician from the power plant, has been sent to tell them to shut down their experiment. During the test, odd shadows quickly cross the room immediately before the screen shows a stark, barren landscape. Danny discovers the screen has become a portal and steps through.

The portal becomes unstable, and the others enter it to rescue him. The portal disappears, stranding them. Pursued by hostile primitives they seek refuge in a cave, which they discover leads to an underground city – all that is left of civilization in a future devastated by nuclear war.

The year is A.D. 2071.  City leader Dr. Varno explains that Earth is unable to support life, and that the residents, along with their androids, are frantically working on a spacecraft which will take them to a planet orbiting Alpha Centauri. The four time travelers, told they may not join that space voyage, are however allowed to work on recreating their time portal to return to their own time. Before the residents can lift off, the degenerate mutant humans break in, destroy the ship, and encroach on the city proper.

Dr. Varno determines that now the only hope is the time portal, so he commits the city's remaining resources to help von Steiner, Connors, White, and McKee rebuild the time portal. They feverishly work as the mutants continue their invasion. Along with a few people from the future, the four travelers escape back to the present just ahead of the mutants, leaving a rear guard of androids. One person throws an object back through the portal which damages the equipment on the other side and shuts down the portal.

The survivors and their futuristic companions return to the lab, only to make a strange discovery. Their past selves are still in the lab, yet to pass through the portal, but they appear frozen. The travelers then realize that they are experiencing time at an accelerated rate; the rest of the world, including their past selves, is moving in extremely slow motion. Their only option is to travel to the date the portal had briefly been set to before being more firmly set to A.D. 2071.  That previous date is over 100,000 years in the future, but the screen is, as before, dark; what lies ahead is unknown. They quickly cross the room, casting the shadows which had been seen before.

When the last one goes through, the screen flashes on briefly and shows the travelers walking in a clearing with trees and grass; the surface of the Earth habitable again.  They begin to build a future there. The film then shows their past selves moving at normal speed again, repeating their actions at an ever accelerating rate to a resounding musical score; the sequence of events of the entire movie rapidly cycles, repeating with ever briefer and fewer clips, leaving the viewer in a time-loop until it abruptly ends (without further explanation) with a shot of the Andromeda Galaxy.

Cast

 Preston Foster as Dr. Erik von Steiner
 Philip Carey as Dr. Steve Connors
 Merry Anders as Carol White
 John Hoyt as Dr. Varno
 Dennis Patrick as Councilman Willard
 Joan Woodbury as Gadra 
 Delores Wells as Reena
 
 Steve Franken as Danny McKee, the Electrician
 Berry Kroeger as Preston
 Gloria Leslie as Councilwoman
 Mollie Glessing as Android
 Peter Strudwick as The Mutant
 J. Edward McKinley as Raymond
 Margaret Seldeen as Miss Hollister

Production
Production began in 1963 under the working title Time Trap. Director Melchior was unable to secure an adequate budget to fully exploit the potential of the story line. His work, however, remains notable in that later critics and later viewers regard the production values as secondary and the film as a solid B-film. In some scenes conjuring tricks are used to compensate for the lack of visual effects; for instance, in one uncut shot, a mask-wearing actor playing an android appears to have his head removed and replaced by another, before walking away.

"In spite of the low budget, this still looks pretty good thanks to intelligent use of the resources available. The portal the scientists create, as Danny discovers, is more than a mere window on the coming years, because they can actually walk through it and pass through the decades to exist in the future."

Cameos and Bit Parts
At 44 minutes into the film Forrest J Ackerman appears briefly in a scene depicting several technicians. Ackerman's only line in the film is "Don't worry. I'm keeping our spacemen happy. Getting things squared away." The joke is a self-referential sight gag; his character is working on a device that turns a circular frame into a square frame (one of the magic tricks referred to above). At the time, Ackerman was editing a science-fiction magazine titled Spacemen. The Time Travelers was heavily promoted in his magazine on the basis of Ackerman's cameo appearance in the film.

Delores Wells' and Steve Franken's characters Reena and Danny McKee develop a romance, and furthermore Reena "sunbathes" with several other female characters (an early example of fan service) in a demonstration of the sexual mores of The Future.

ReceptionThe Time Travelers was a B film, evident by its meagre production values, although both the plot and actors were singled out for mention by critics. Leonard Maltin considered the film "not bad with a downbeat ending, one of the first American films photographed by Vilmos Zsigmond".  It was lampooned decades later in the Netflix revival of Mystery Science Theater 3000''.

See also
List of American films of 1964
 List of apocalyptic films
 List of films featuring time loops

Notes

References

External links 
 
 
 
 
 The Time Travellers at Trailers from Hell

1960s science fiction films
1964 films
American International Pictures films
American science fiction films
American independent films
Films about time travel
Films scored by Richard LaSalle
Films set in 1964
Films set in 2071
1960s English-language films
1960s American films